Oh Dal-su (born 15 June 1968) is a South Korean actor.

Career
Oh Dal-su began his acting career in theater in Busan, and since 2001 has been the head of theater company Singiru Manhwagyeong ("Mirage and Kaleidoscope"). His rich experience on the stage, in local productions such as Ogu, later made Oh an in-demand supporting/character actor on the big screen.

Oh has starred in numerous successful films, in roles such as the owner of the organized crime-funded private jail in Oldboy (2003), a former gang boss in Mapado (2005), a weapons smuggler in A Bittersweet Life (2005), a transvestite in Foxy Festival (2010), a Chinese-Korean conman in The Thieves (2012), and a sympathetic inmate in Miracle in Cell No. 7. He also dubbed the voice of the monster in The Host (2006).

Sexual harassment allegations
On 22 February 2018, Oh was accused of sexual harassment. He denied the accusation. On 26 February, further accusations against Oh were broadcast on JTBC Newsroom, during an interview with a woman who accused Oh of sexual harassment and sexual assault. The following day, actress Uhm Ji-young came forward in JTBC's Newsroom, saying that she was also sexually harassed by Oh in 2003. As a result, Oh pulled out of his upcoming TV series My Mister. On 28 February, he admitted to sexual abuse and apologized to the victims.

In March 2018, Oh was dropped from Along with the Gods: The Two Worlds cast. In June, it was reported that the release of three films that Oh has starred in; I Want to Know Your Parents, Good Neighbor, and Control, has been postponed indefinitely.

Filmography

Film

Theater

Awards and nominations

Listicles

References

External links

 
 
 

 

South Korean male film actors
South Korean male stage actors
South Korean male television actors
People from Daegu
1968 births
Living people
20th-century South Korean male actors
21st-century South Korean male actors
Dong-Eui University alumni